Neblo is a village in the Municipality of Brda in the Littoral region of Slovenia on the border with Italy.

The local church is dedicated to Saint Nicholas and belongs to the Parish of Šlovrenc.

References

External links
Neblo on Geopedia

Populated places in the Municipality of Brda

nl:Medana
sl:Medana